The Home Guard – National Security Forces is a military reserve force of the Swedish Armed Forces. It was formally established on May 29, 1940, during World War II upon popular demand. While originally composed of former militia groups, today it comprises half of the Swedish Army, thus constituting the basis of the territorial defence of Sweden.

The Home Guard consists mainly of local rapid response units, numbering 17,000 of the 22,000 total Home Guard strength, organised in 40 battalions, with 23 associated auxiliary defence organisations. Most soldiers maintain a civilian job while serving the army part-time. Rapid response units were formed in the early 2000s in parallel to the Swedish government's abolishment of conscription to the Swedish Armed Forces; small-scale conscription has since been reintroduced.

The Chief of Home Guard is the commanding officer of the Home Guard, representing 40,000 present and veteran soldiers, reporting directly to the Supreme Commander of the Swedish Armed Forces.

History

The establishment of the Home Guard was passed into law by the Riksdag on May 29, 1940, after the beginning of World War II, however, units had already been formed by the military before this. Home Guard units were groups of usually eight to 15 men that were to serve as defense units in case of war, located in towns and in both private and state-owned factories, throughout all of Sweden. Members of these small units usually consisted of former professional military men who were equipped with rifles, machine guns, ammunition, medicine, uniforms, and had the option of buying additional materials such as skis, sweaters and marching boots. An additional group, called the Swedish Women's Voluntary Defence Organization, helped with additional tasks that the Home Unit was unable to perform themselves. The Swedish Women's Voluntary Defence Organization helped provide the home unit with additional items such as socks, scarves and gloves as well as performing all administrative work that the unit could not afford to do themselves. In case of war, and in case the Home Guard was unable to utilize local hospitals, the Swedish Red Cross was prepared to set up first aid stations for its use.

Organisation

The Home Guard with the national security forces are part of the Swedish Armed Forces' mission-based organization. The Home Guard is a unit and constitutes the basis for the protection of Sweden. It has the task of operating over the entire conflict scale, from societal support during great strains in peacetime to armed combat in times of war.

The units of the Home Guard have a response capability that is measured in hours, as opposed to days or weeks. The personnel is made up of locally recruited volunteers and consists largely of experienced soldiers and officers with a background in mission-based units.

When the Armed Forces are called in to help with forest fires, flooding or missing person searches, it often falls to Home Guard units to support the police and Rescue Services. Territorial surveillance, base security, escort duties, transport protection, target identification and artillery spotting are other typical Home Guard duties.

In addition to personnel who have completed their national service or Basic Military Training, the Home Guard includes a large proportion of specialists, for example, paramedics, motorcycle orderlies and dog handlers, that are recruited and trained by voluntary defense organizations.

Territorial organisation 
Sweden is divided into four military regions:

 Northern Military Region (MR N) comprises Norrbotten, Västerbotten, Jämtland and Västernorrland counties. The regional command is located at Norrbotten Regiment (I 19) headquarters in Boden.
 Central Military Region (MR M) comprises Stockholm and Gotland, Södermanland, Uppsala, Västmanland, Dalarna and Gävleborg counties. The regional command is located at the Life Guards (LG) headquarters in Stockholm.
 Western Military Region (MR V) comprises Västra Götaland, Halland, Örebro and Värmland counties. The regional command is located at Skaraborg Regiment (P 4) headquarters in Skövde.
 Southern Military Region (MR S) comprises Skåne, Blekinge, Kronoberg, Jönköping, Kalmar and Östergötland counties. The regional command is located at South Scanian Regiment (P 7) headquarters Revinge.

Home Guard battalions are supported for administration, training and logistics by 22 Training Groups (Swedish Utbildningsgrupp). The Training Groups are for the most parts the descendants of disbanded regiments and most Home Guard battalions carry the colours and traditions of its antecedent regiment, e.g. the 17. Dalabataljonen which carries the colours and traditions of the Dalarna Regiment (raised 1628 and disbanded in 2000). Usually, each Training Group supports 1-2 battalions but some have four battalions. The Training Groups in turn belong to a regular regiment. Uniform guidelines and materials for courses are determined centrally by the National Home Guard Combat School.

Units
As of 2012, the Home Guard consists of 22,000 soldiers (down from 42,000 in 2001) organized into 40 light infantry battalions (down from 69 in 2001) of 300-700 personnel.

In 2001, the Rapid Response units numbered around 5,000 soldiers of the total of 42,000. Rapid Response units have more combat tasks compared to the rest of the Home Guard, including escort duties. Some battalions located near the coast also have marine companies equipped with Combat Boat 90.

As of 2014, the majority of the force, 17,000 out of 22,000 soldiers will be in Rapid Response units. The decrease in number of troops comes with an equal increase in quality and modern equipment.

Doctrine of Defence 
 There are two main ways to form a doctrine for defence: static and dynamic.

A static defence could for example be stationing coastal missile batteries on Gotland. No warning is needed, the equipment and staff is already in place and can hold the area.
A dynamic defence could for example be stationing a coastal missile battery in conjunction with an air transport and airborne troops ready to be transported to any area if warning is given.
The current doctrine MSD 16 includes elements of both strategies in synergy.

According to MSD 16 the National Security Forces are to have an increased integration with the Swedish Defence. National Defensive Force operators are stationed in the area where they live. This means they know the terrain and can more easily spot unusual activity. They will also be the first on site, with the role of detecting, reporting and if possible denying an intruder freedom of action. As first responders to any given region, they are also required to support the mobilisation of the specialised, dynamic defence.

The current organisation of the Swedish defence has highly specialised units which requires time to assemble. During this period, there would be no opposition for a forward operating resource such as an aerial troop landing. However the National Defensive Forces are stationed in the area where they live. In case of a surprise attack, the National Security Forces Handbook states that the National Defensive Forces are to become an integrated part of the dynamic response of the Swedish defence. Since each operator is stationed in the area they live in, they know the terrain, they notice when something is out of place and thus will likely be the first to detect and respond to an incursion. By using knowledge of terrain they are to deny, delay or harass the opposing force until friendly specialised units have been mobilised to the given theatre. They can also aid with this knowledge to achieve synergy in the counteroperation.

The current role of the National Security Forces is dynamic, first acting as the spearhead, first on site. After the more specialised troops have been mobilised and deployed, the role shifts to either aiding the unarmed civilian defence force and securing food, medical care and infrastructure for civilians, or fighting the invading force using asymmetric warfare and local knowledge.

Key Tasks 
 Assist/protect mobilisation of specialised units (Swedish Defence)
 Early intelligence
 Make use of forward operating forces difficult or impossible
 Protect key assets from sabotage and theft by qualified or unqualified actors
 Contingency: Free War Doctrine

Protection and assistance of mobilisation of specialised units 
The Swedish Defence units are highly specialised, but operators may live far from the given base. Mobilisation during a surprise attack could take several days. The National Defence Force (Hemvärnet) is composed of less specialised units, and each operator is assigned to a unit near their home. This makes Hemvärnet the first qualified force on site, anywhere within the national borders of Sweden. With this in mind, one of the primary roles are to protect the mobilisation of the specialised units as well as assisting through local knowledge.

The lower degree of specialisation of the National Defence Force is here a significant strength, as they are by default able to function well in the random groups that would be formed during the initial phases of a surprise attack. Each unit is expected to practice this.

Early Intelligence 
During the initial phases of a surprise conflict, confusion may be significant. With local knowledge, and being the first assembled force on site, the National Defence Force can provide centralised command posts with accurate intelligence. This in turn allows for a more synergistic allocation of resources, and gives a more robust situational awareness to allow for decisions. A secondary effect of accurate intelligence is giving political leaders a correct and reliable strategic situational image.

Against Qualified Hostile Forward Operating Resource 
 Detect and report activity to give central command accurate situation intelligence.
 Denial of Access.
 Denial of Freedom of Action.
 Denial of freedom of movement.
 Delaying field work.
 Detection of hostile forward operating elements using dogs, alarm systems, alarm mines and local knowledge.
 If opforce is detected within a key asset, certain National Security Force units have the task to re-take the key asset.
 If possible, elimination of hostile forward operating elements.
 Covert reconnaissance.
 Force reconnaissance.
 Protection of key assets from sabotage or attack.
 Destruction of key assets if undefendable. If excessive explosive loads are used for example on a concrete harbour, only gravel will be left, easily overcome by landing crafts. Destruction is in this case designed to transform the asset into large blocks forming delaying obstacles. For this purpose, special destruction tubes have been built into certain key assets.
 Protection of civilians

Against Unqualified Opportunistic Actors 
 Guarding key assets
 Noticing when situation deviates from normal activity, possibly indicating imminent sabotage or theft.
 Protection of civilians
For clarification:
Unqualified opportunistic actors are usually divided into two groups. Criminals and political, with varying overlap.

Criminal gangs, "gangs of war", are actors who want to steal things for monetary gain. Perhaps they want weapons so they can extort locals, or perhaps they want to steal food deliveries to sell them for extremely high prices.

Politically motivated actors, who may seek to aid the invader, or seek to cause so much chaos that they're free to (for a short time) reign over an area and do whatever pleases them.

Though motivations of these may be seen as the polar opposites of each other, their modus operandi are very similar.

Contingency 
If all contact with friendly forces is lost, National Security Forces are to follow the "Free War" doctrine. This gives broad authority to the ranking officer and has three goals:
 Engage, delay or harass hostile forces at own discretion.
 Use any means to rejoin or contact friendly forces for synergistic effect.
 Protection of civilians

Method of operation 
 
The Home Guard units are trained to be local combat units (primarily infantry but also signal troops). Although current doctrine states that Home Guard units can act anywhere within the country, local knowledge is one of the strengths of the organization. Training focuses on guard duties and weapons proficiency.

In peacetime the Home Guards main task is to help with search and rescue operations, and to provide assistance to civil society in cases of severe emergencies such as natural disasters and the like.

Requirements 
The Home Guard soldier must fulfill the following requirements in order to be object to admittance:
 Swedish citizenship
 Minimum 85 days of basic military training (2 weeks for specialists such as signalists, drivers, dog handlers etc. in addition to their role specific training)
 Approval of personal appraisal - personal examination by the Military Intelligence and Security department, the police and the municipal authorities - and otherwise be suitable for service
 Availability for duty in the Home Guard
 Approved "disposition right". A person who is "war placed" at another institution is required to be at that institution during an emergency or war. If, for example, a police officer applies to the National Security Forces, the unit will be denied disposition right for this applicant. The officer can still hold a peacetime role, but can not be assigned a war time placement.

Troops are trained regularly and conditions of suitability abilities tested continually.

Training
 
Contractually a member of the Home Guard must train four days (before 2010 20 hours) per year up to eight days for the Rapid Response units, although the time requirement varies according to role. A prerequisite for joining the Home Guard is to have received at least 85 days of basic military training for combat roles and two weeks for certain specialist roles such as signalists, field cooks, nurses and dog handlers. The level of training varies widely, from basic military training to Ranger school.

The training is centered around two 4-day-long battalion exercises per year for the Rapid Response units and one 4-day exercise for the support units. These exercises are mandatory for all personnel. Apart from the mandatory training, the companies organize their own exercises, often up to ten weekend-long exercises a year.

Equipment

The standard armaments are Ak 4B and Ak 4C battle rifles, (Swedish version of the German G3), with red dot sights for riflemen and with x4 optical sights for squad sharpshooters, the Ak4B can also be equipped with an M203 grenade launcher. Support weapons include the Ksp 58 (FN MAG) machine gun, grg m/48 (Carl-Gustaf) recoilless rifle and Pskott m/86 light anti-tank weapons. The AK4 was the standard weapon of the Swedish Armed Forces until its replacement by the AK5 (FN FNC derivative). Psg 90 sniper rifles are also issued to designated snipers and some personnel (usually officers, senior non-commissioned officers, dog handlers and support personnel) are issued with Pistol 88 pistols. Other equipment includes anti-tank mines and manually detonated anti-personnel mines, explosives and signals equipment. Second generation night vision equipment is also used, but illumination flares are mainly used. Signals equipment at platoon level include Ra180 backpack radios and individual radios are issued to riflemen. In 2015, some battalions started recruiting mortar platoons equipped with 120 mm m/41D mortars.

Dogs are also used as sensor systems, usually two for every platoon. The animals are issued and trained by one of the national auxiliary defence organizations.

The rapid response units have thus far been equipped with Volvo C303 cross country vehicles and Bandvagn 206 tracked carriers. Currently the introduction of a modified Mercedes Sprint 316 (Personbil 8) is underway to replace the earlier wheeled vehicles.

Home Guard Bands 
 

Military traditions are strongly connected with military bands and marches, etc. The bands, with diverse military musicians, fulfil the task to replace professional military bands. Throughout Sweden, there are about 32 Home Guard bands which total more than 1,500 members, such as Södertörn Home Guard Band. 17 bands are qualified for performance at state ceremonies, royal visits and festivities. Aside from the bands, Home Guard Bugle Bands also are in service within their respective areas, doing tasks formerly done by the now defunct drum and bugle corps of the Armed Forces.

Home Guard Cadets
The Home Guard Cadets (hemvärnsungdomar) is a youth section consisting of young girls and boys aged 15–20, typically recruited at age 15–16. The Cadets receive military training that includes base building, L-ABCDE first aid, CPR, communications, physical training, orienteering, defense studies, basic firearms training (with .22 long rifle up to age 16 and AK4 B with red dot sight from age 17) and from age 17 and up also patrolling and leadership training (group and platoon). At 18, a Cadet is allowed to undergo battle training. Despite this they are not officially called soldiers.

Although there is no rank system for Cadets, the training consists of 4 1-year-long blocks named Basic Course, Continuation Course, Leadership Course Level 1 and Leadership Course Level 2 (Grundkurs, GK; Fortsättningskurs, FK; Ledarskapskurs 1, LK1; and Ledarskapskurs 2, LK2. LK1 and LK2 are sometimes called Practical Course, PK, and Instruktörskurs, IK which means Practical Course and Instructor Course). After 4 years as a Cadet, the 19- to 20-year-old has received military training equivalent to 85 days of basic military training, plus basic commander training.

Typically, the Cadets train one day or evening every or every other week, with 10-12 weekends per year spent in the field. The Home Guard Cadets is the "unit" who spend the most time out on the field in the whole Home Guard. During training they wear the same type of uniform and equipment as the regular forces, although it may vary between the sections depending on local budget and resources. From 2008, a Cadet at least 18 years of age who has completed at least the first three blocks of training is welcome to take a course to repeat and improve learned skills in order to serve in the regular Home Guard at age 20. This is very valuable to many of them, since many of them will not be needed in the Army, Navy or Air Force but are still eager to do military service.

Associated organisations
 
The Home Guard also includes staff from eight voluntary organisations, so-called contractual organisations:

 Swedish Voluntary Flying Corps (FFK) – reconnaissance and transport
 Swedish Air Force Volunteers Association (FVRF) – support for the Swedish Air Force
 Swedish Parachute Association (Svenska Fallskärmsförbundet, SFF)
 Swedish Voluntary Motorcycle Corps (Frivilliga Motorcykelkåren, FMCK) – despatch riders and reconnaissance
 Swedish Voluntary Radio Organization (FRO) – Radio and telephone connection
 Swedish Working Dog Club (Svenska Brukshundklubben, SBK) – service dogs, and Crawl, searching
 Swedish Central Federation of Motor Transport Corps (Sveriges Bilkårers Riksförbund, SBR) – Transport and drivers
 Swedish Women's Voluntary Defence Organization (SLK) – rope and staff procedures
 Swedish Auxiliary Naval Corps (SVK) – Water Transport in and defense of the archipelago
 Swedish Civil Defence League (Civilförsvarsförbundet) – Educating people on how to handle various crisis situations
 Swedish Federation for Voluntary Defence Education and Training – healthcare professionals and CBRN staff
 Swedish Pistol Shooting Association (Svenska pistolskytteförbundet, SPSF)
 Swedish Shooting Sport Federation (SvSF)

Heraldry and traditions

Colours, standards and guidons

The first colour of the Home Guard is drawn by Ingrid Lamby and manufactured with appliqué technique by the Engelbrektsson Flag factory. The colour was presented by His Majesty the King Carl XVI Gustaf in 1995. Blazon: "On blue cloth in the centre the badge of the National Home Guard; the letter H under three open crowns placed two and one, all in yellow". The second colour of the Home Guard is a double swallow-tailed Swedish flag.

Coat of arms
The coat of the arms of the Home Guard since 1940. Blazon: "Azure, the letter H under three open crowns or, placed two and one, all or".

Medals
In 1947, the Home Guard Medal of Merit in gold (HVGM) of the 8th size was established. It was revised in 1951 and in 1974. The medal ribbon is of blue moiré with five evenly divided yellow stripes. The Home Guard Medal of Merit also comes in a silver issue (HVSM).

In 1951, the Home Guard Silver Medal (HvSM) of the 8th size was established. The reverse varies in the different defence districts or production-guards. The medal ribbon is of blue moiré with one yellow stripe on each side and two yellow stripes on the middle.

In 1996, the Hemvärnets Petrimedalj ("The Home Guard Petri Medal") in silver and bronze (HvPetriSM/BM) of the 8th size was established. It was revised in 2001. The medal ribbon is of green moiré with broad blue edges and with a yellow line in the middle of the blue fields. The ribbon is attached to a narrow pole carried by two slanting ornaments of leaves.

In 2006, the Home Guard Bronze Medal (HvBM) of the 8th size was established. The medal is exactly the same in design as the Home Guard Silver Medal, but is embossed in bronze. The ribbon of blue moiré pattern with two vertical yellow, two mm wide stripes in the middle. The number of awards is marked with metal stars on the ribbon and ribbon bar.

In 2019, the Home Guard Service Medal (HVtjgSM/GM/GMmemalj) of the 8th size was established. The award is given to a Home Guard soldiers, Home Guard musicians and volunteer staff with a valid Home Guard contract and to those who remain in the Home Guard as a Home Guard veteran. The medal is made of three denominations: silver, gold and gold with enamel.

In addition to these medals, the Association of Home Guard Officers (Hemvärnsbefälets Riksförbund, HBR) awards the Association of Home Guard Officers Royal Medal since 1996 (silver medal since 2018) and the Association of Home Guard Officers Merit Badge since 1991.

Other
On 4 November 1946, the march "Hemvärnets marsch" (Damberg) was adopted, that in connection with a prize competition.

Chief of Home Guard

The Chief of Home Guard is the commanding officer of the Home Guard:

Hemvärnschefer
1940-07-01 – 1952-03-31: Gustaf Petri
1947-04-01 – 1948-06-30: Sven-Erik Allstrin

Rikshemvärnschefer
1948-07-01 – 1952-03-31: Sven-Erik Allstrin
1952-04-01 – 1955-09-30: Gunnar Brinck
1955-10-01 – 1968-09-30: Per Kellin
1968-10-01 – 1971-09-30: Karl Gustaf Brandberg
1971-10-01 – 1980-12-31: Fredrik Löwenhielm
1981-01-01 – 1983-09-30: Karl Eric Holm
1983-10-01 – 1988-03-01: Robert Lugn
1988-04-01 – 1988-09-30: Lars-Eric Wahlgren
1988-10-01 – 1994-03-31: Reinhold Lahti
1994-04-31 – 1997-09-30: Jan-Olof Borgén
1997-10-01 – 2000-06-30: Alf Sandqvist
2000-07-01 – 2002-09-30: Mats Welff
2002-10-01 – 2005-06-30: Anders Lindström
2005-07-01 – 2018-08-30: Roland Ekenberg
2018-09-01 – present: Stefan Sandborg

Names, designations and locations

References

Notes

Print

External links

Swedish National Home Guard official website 
Swedish Armed Forces official website 

Home Guard
Militias in Europe
1940 establishments in Sweden
Military units and formations disestablished in 1940